Semnan University is a young highly prestigious public research university in Asia. It is located in Semnan, Iran, about 216 km east of Tehran. It is known as "Diamond solitaire of the wisdom in the desert". The university has over 16,500 students, 72 undergraduate programs, 102 MSc programs, 65 PhD programs, 48 international MSc programs, and 37 international PhD programs. It has 26 faculties, 2 colleges, 2 institutes, 11 Research and Development centers, one Science and Technology Park, and one Advanced Technologies Incubator Centre.

The initial nucleus of Semnan University was formed in 1975 with the establishment of Semnan Higher Education Center. It launched its activities with 580 students to study in seven programs (Associate degree) with an area of 5000 square meters.

After the Islamic Revolution, in 1979, extensive as well as fundamental changes were implemented at the Center at large. In 1989 Semnan Higher Education Center started its work under new title of Semnan Higher Education Complex while it enhanced its Electronic & Civil programs to a Bachelor level. Finally, with opening of the faculty of engineering, faculty of teacher training and faculty of veterinary medicine, Semnan Higher Education Complex changed its status to Semnan University in 1994.

Presently, Semnan University has over 16,500 students who study in 72 programs leading to the bachelor's degree (B.S.), 102 programs leading to the master's degree (MSc.), 65 programs leading to the PhD degrees, 48 programs leading to the international master's degree, and 37 international PhD programs . At present there are 26 faculties, 2 colleges, 2 institutes, 11 Research and Development centers, one Science and Technology Park, one Advanced Technologies Incubator Center. Semnan University has so expanded to include seven campuses:

 Engineering and Technology campus
 New Sciences and Technologies campus
 Human Sciences campus
 Basic Sciences campus
 Art campus
 Veterinary, Agriculture, and Natural resources campus
 International campus

The university has 370 and 244 full-time and part-time academic members respectively. It is situated in the Northeast part of the Semnan city with an area of 800 hectares. Libraries, computer centers, sports halls, restaurants, coffee shop and several dormitories are other facilities of the university. Since Semnan University is relatively young and newly established it is still under expansion and development.

The School of Civil Engineering is one of the  university faculties.  It was opened in 2008, and is located in the campus of the University of Engineering and offers 1 bachelor's degree, 5 master's degrees and 5 doctoral degrees. It has more than 600 students. The department currently has 18 faculty members, one is professor and 3 associate professors. Doctor Abdol Hossein Haddad is the responsibility of the Department of Civil Engineering and Engineer Mahmoud Rahmani is the director of the School of Education and adjutancy of educations. The Department of Civil Engineering commenced its activities in 1991 with the admission of undergraduate students.

Electrical and Computer Engineering Faculty is another engineering faculty of Semnan university. This faculty is located in north-west of the main campus of the university. Electronic, telecommunications engineering, control, electric power systems, mechatronics engineering, electromagnetic fields and waves, information technology (IT), artificial intelligence, software engineering, hardware engineering as well as RF and microwave engineering are taught in Semnan university.

Notable faculty
Ali Kheyroddin

References 

Educational institutions established in 1975
Universities in Iran
Education in Semnan Province
Buildings and structures in Semnan Province